The Mercure Eastgate Hotel (aka The Eastgate locally) is a hotel located in the historic university city of Oxford, England. It is located on the south side of Oxford's High Street near to the Ruskin School of Drawing and Fine Art and the Examination Schools of Oxford University.

History
The site was previously occupied by an inn called the Crosse Sword. The hotel is a converted 17th-century coaching inn located at the corner of Merton Street on the site of the town wall's former east gate. The building was converted by Edward Prioleau Warren in 1899–1900, and the stuccoed style of the building echoes other 18th-century buildings in Oxford.

Local legend
Ross Andrews links reports of the sound of men in armour and sightings of English Civil War era Royalist soldiers passing through walls to the hotel's location on the site of the old east gate, and speculates about a surprise attack by Parliamentarian forces.

Literature
The Eastgate was mentioned by John Betjeman (1906–1984) in his poetry:

References

1900 establishments in England
Hotel buildings completed in 1900
Hotels established in 1900
Hotels in Oxford
Town Gates in England
Former gates
Reportedly haunted locations in South East England